A scenic railway is an early roller coaster design that uses only road wheels. It usually requires a brakeman to ride on the train and slow it, if needed. Their name derives from the fact that they are often adorned with elaborate façades.

Current installations 
 The Scenic Railway at Luna Park, Melbourne. Built in 1912, it is the oldest continuously operating roller coaster in the world, and the oldest roller coaster in Australia.
 Rutschebanen (literally, "The Roller Coaster") at Tivoli Gardens in Denmark. Built by Denmark native Valdemar Lebech.  Opened in 1914.
 The Scenic Railway at Dreamland Margate in Kent, England. Opened in 1920, The Scenic Railway was granted Grade II listed status in the UK by English Heritage – the UK equivalent of a national historic landmark. In 2008 a portion of the ride was damaged in a fire and the ride ceased operation. It underwent restoration and Dreamland reopened on 19 June 2015 following an £18m investment.
 The Hullámvasút at Vidámpark in Budapest, Hungary. Built in 1922, opened in 1926, after it was set on fire. Hullámvasút closed on 11 November 2015, but remains standing.
 The Montaña Suiza ("Swiss Mountain" in Spanish) at Parque de Atracciones Monte Igueldo in Donostia/San Sebastián, Spain. Built by Erich Heidrich and operating since 1928.
 The Roller Coaster at Great Yarmouth Pleasure Beach in Norfolk, England. Also built by Erich Heidrich for the Colonial Exhibition in Paris in 1929. Moved to Great Yarmouth in 1932.
 Rutschebanen (the name literally means "The Roller Coaster") at Dyrehavsbakken in Denmark. Built by Denmark native Valdemar Lebech.  Opened in 1932.
 The Hochschaubahn at Wurstelprater in Vienna, Austria. Opened in 1950 as a replacement for the original, which was destroyed during World War II.
 Vuoristorata at Linnanmäki in Helsinki, Finland. Built by Denmark native Valdemar Lebech. A slightly taller and longer copy of Rutschebanen at Dyrehavsbakken in Denmark. Opened in 1951, still featuring the original oak wooden trains operated by brakemen.

References 

Types of roller coaster